Grisha Bruskin (born October 21, 1945)  is a Russian artist known as a painter, sculptor, and printmaker.

He was born in Moscow. Between 1963 and 1968, he studied at the Moscow Textile Institute (Art Department). In 1969, he became a member of the Artists' Union of the USSR. Bruskin's participation in the famous Sotheby's auction in Moscow (1988) brought him worldwide fame, when his piece, "Fundamental Lexicon" was sold for a record price.

He relocated to New York in 1988. In 1999, at the invitation of the German government and as a representative of Russia, Bruskin created a monumental triptych, "Life Above All" for the reconstructed Reichstag in Berlin. In 2001 he published a memoir-style book, "Past Imperfect." In 2012 he received the Kandinsky Prize in the "Project of the Year" category, for his project, "H-Hour." Bruskin lives and works in New York and Moscow. He is one of the best-known and most successful contemporary artists of Russian origins.

Exhibitions

 2012, Grisha Bruskin, H-Hour , Multimedia Art Museum, Moscow

Books
 2001. Past Imperfect.  Novoye Literaturnoye Obozreniye; 2nd ed. 2007.
 2002. Das Alphabet des Grisha Bruskin.  Kunsthalle in Emden.
 2003. Yours Truly.  Novoye Literaturnoye Obozreniye. 
 2005. Letter Follows.  Novoye Literaturnoye Obozreniye.
 2006. Alefbet. Tapestry. Palace Editions; Russian language edition) , .

 2008. Life is Everywhere. Palace Editions; Russian language edition ; English language edition . 
 2008. Direct and Indirect Objects. SBN 978-5-86793-566-5 Novoye Literaturnoye Obozreniye.
 2008. Past Imperfect: 318 Episodes from the Life of a Russian Artist. ,  Syracuse University Press.
 2010. Alefbet. Tapisserie (English and French languages edition).  Lienart.
 2011. Towards Bruskin. . Novoye Literaturnoye Obozreniye.
 2012. H-Hour (Russian  language edition). . Multimedia Art Museum.
 2013. H-Hour (English language edition)  Kerber Art.
 2013. Archaeologist's Collection (Russian language edition).  Breus.
 2014. Archaeologist's Collection (English language edition).  Kerber Art.
 2015. Alefbet. Alfabeto della memoria/The Alphabet of Memory. (Italian and English language edition)  Terra ferma.
 2015. An Archaeologist's Collection. (English language edition)   Terra Ferma.

References

External links
Official website

1945 births
Living people
Soviet painters
Russian Jews
Soviet emigrants to the United States
20th-century Russian painters
Russian male painters
21st-century Russian painters
Artists from Moscow
Russian contemporary artists
Kandinsky Prize
Moscow State Textile University alumni
20th-century Russian male artists
21st-century Russian male artists